Zorba may refer to:

Arts and entertainment
Zorba (comics), a fictional character from Marvel Comics
Zorba the Greek, a 1946 novel by the Greek author Nikos Kazantzakis
Syrtaki, a Greek dance commonly called the Zorba
Zorba the Greek (film), a 1964 movie based on the novel
Zorba (musical), a musical based on the novel and film
Zorba's Dance, a song by Mikis Theodorakis featured in the film
Zorba the Hutt, a Star Wars Legends character

Other uses
Zorba the Buddha, a Rajneesh concept owing in part to the Kazantzakis novel character
Zorba (Mastiff), world's largest dog, now deceased
Zorba Paster, physician and public radio personality
Zorba (XQuery processor), an open source implementation of the XQuery query/programming language
Sorik, a town in Armenia formerly called Zorba
A nickname of Peter Metropolis (born 1944), an Australian rules football player and administrator
Zorba (computer), a 1983 CP/M-based portable computer
Zorba (scrap), the collective term for shredded and pre-treated non-ferrous scrap metals